Pterolophia ferrugineotincta is a species of beetle in the family Cerambycidae. It was described by Per Olof Christopher Aurivillius in 1926. It is known from Príncipe.

References

ferrugineotincta
Beetles described in 1926